Pyrophanite is a manganese titanium oxide mineral with formula: MnTiO3. It is a member of the ilmenite group. It is a deep red to greenish black mineral which crystallizes in the trigonal system.

Discovery and occurrence
It was first described in 1890 from an occurrence in the Harstigen Mine, Filipstad, Värmland, Sweden. Its name was derived from the Greek πΰρ, fire, and φαίνεσθαι, to appear, because of the deep red color of the mineral.

Its main occurrence is in manganese deposits that have undergone metamorphism. It also occurs in granite, amphibolite and serpentinite as an uncommon accessory  
mineral. Associated minerals include ilmenite, geikielite, hematite, spinel, gahnite, chromite, magnetite, ganophyllite, manganophyllite, hendricksite, garnet and calcite.

References

Oxide minerals
Manganese(II) minerals
Titanium minerals
Trigonal minerals
Minerals in space group 148